The Monégasque passport is issued to citizens of Monaco for international travel. In 2009 there were an estimated 6,000 in circulation.  The passport is burgundy in colour and has the national coat of arms and the words "Principauté de Monaco" (Principality of Monaco) on it.

Visa requirements

As of 05 January 2021, Monégasque citizens had visa-free or visa on arrival access to 174 countries and territories, ranking the Monégasque passport 15th overall (tied with Chile and Cyprus) in terms of travel freedom according to the Henley Passport Index, making it the highest ranking passport of any European country not belonging to either the European Union or EFTA.

See also
Visa requirements for Monégasque citizens
Citizenship law of Monaco
Monégasque identity card

References

Passports by country
Government of Monaco
Foreign relations of Monaco